The Chand kings were a Hindu Chandel Rajput ruling clan of Kumaon Kingdom. The Chand kingdom was established by displacing the Katyuri kings by Som Chand,a Chandel prince from Jhushi. They ruled until before they were defeated by the Gorkha Kingdom in 1790 CE. The Chand kings ruled over the Kumaon Kingdom and parts of the Farwestern Nepal called Doti in present day Sudurpashchim Province.

History

Inception 
The Chand kingdom was established by Som Chand in the 10th century, by displacing the Katyuri Kings, who had been ruling the area from the 7th century AD. He continued to call his state Kurmanchal, and established its capital in Champawat in Kali Kumaon, called so, due to its vicinity to river Kali.

Many temples built in this former capital city, during the 11th and 12th century exist today, this include the Baleshwar and Nagnath temples. Later their capital was shifted to Almora by Raja Kalyan Chand in 1563, when he laid the foundation of a town name 'Alam Nagar', which was also called, 'Rajapur', a name that still used and has been found inscribed on a number of copper plates of the time.
In 1581, the Chand King, Rudra Chand (1565–1597), son of Raja Kalyan Chand seized Sira defeating Raika king Hari Malla and attacked the Garhwal Kingdom for the first time, though this attack was repulsed by then king, Dularam Sah, and so were his subsequent attacks. Rudra Chandra was a contemporary of Akbar, and even paid him a visit in Lahore in 1587, as a mark of his obeisance. Akbarnama mentions him as "one of the great landlords of India", and further talks about his initial hesitation in approaching the court of Akbar, it was only Raja Todar Mal himself, sent his son Kalyan Das to assure him, did his proceed to meet Akbar. Subsequently, the two met and agreed on a concord, and thus Ain-e-Akbari, written during period of Akbar, also mentions the Sarkar of Kumaon, containing 21 Mahals (a geographical unit of the times) and the revenue collected.

After death of Rudra Chand in 1597, his son, Lakshmi Chand, also continued attacks of Garhwal for many years, though he too was repulsed. He also constructed the 'Bagnath temple' at Bageshwar in 1602.

Peak 
One of the most powerful rulers of the Chand dynasty was Baz Bahadur (1638–78), who met Shahjahan in Delhi, and in 1655 joined forces with him to attack Garhwal, which was under its king, Pirthi Sah, and subsequently captured the Terai region including Dehradun, which was hence separated from the Garhwal kingdom. Baz Bahadur extended his territory east to Karnali river.

In 1672, Baz Bahadur started a poll tax, and its revenue was sent to Delhi as a tribute. Baz Bahadur also built the Golu Devata Temple, at Ghorakhal, near Bhimtal, after Lord Golu, a general in his army, who died valiantly at war.  He also built the Bhimeshwara Mahadev Temple at Bhimtal.

Towards the end of 17th century, Chand Rajas again attacked the Garhwal kingdom, and in 1688 Udyot Chand erected several temples at Almora, including Tripur Sundari, Udyot Chandeshwer and Parbateshwer, to mark his victory over Garhwal and Doti. The Pabateshwar temple was renamed twice, to become the present Nanda Devi temple. Later, Jagat Chand (1708–20), defeated the Raja of Garhwal and pushed him away from Srinagar, and his kingdom was given to a Brahmin.  However, a subsequent king of Garhwal, Pradip Shah (1717–72), regained control over Garhwal and retained Doon till 1757, when Rohilla leader Najib-ul-Daula established himself there, though he was ousted soon by Pradip Shah.

The Chand kings also defeated the Rajwars of Askot, though the latter were allowed to hold their land on the payment of a tribute.

The hill station of Binsar, 30 km from Almora was a summer retreat of the Chand kings.

In the coming years, Jagat Chand's successor, Debi Chand (1720-6) took part in the wars of Rohillas of Rohilkhand, and was defeated by the British troops.

Decline 
In 1744, Ali Mohammed Khan, the Rohilla leader, sent a force into the Chand territory and penetrated through Bhimtal in the Nainital district to Almora; the resistance of Chand army, under its ruler, Kalyan Chand, was weak and ineffective, and Almora fell to the Rohillas, who stayed here for seven short months, though they were ultimately driven out, an exit made possible by paying them a sum of three lakh rupees, and hastened by the harsh terrain of the region.

This peace didn't last long as after just three months, unhappy over his lieutenants, Ali Mohammed Khan attacked again, though this time, he was stopped right at the entrance to the hills, at Barakheri, and defeated; and he made no further attempts to conquer the Kumaon kingdom, nor did the Muslim rulers of Delhi, and this remained the first and the last attack by Muslim rulers on the region. Reconciliation subsequently came into effected; troops from the hills, under Dip Chand, fought side by side with the Rohillas at Third Battle of Panipat in 1761.

In 1760, he renamed the old Parbateshwer temple as Dipchandeshwar temple.

During British rule, then divisional commissioner of Kumaon, George William Trail, got the  statue of the Nanda Devi, which had been relocated to the Udyot Chandeshwar temple, from the 'Malla Mahal' (Upper Court) of Chand kings, where the present collectorate exists, and in time, the temple started being called the 'Nanda Devi temple'. The 'Talla Mahal' (Lower Court) of Chand rulers now houses the District Hospital.

Due to internal strife, in the coming thirty years the kings lost most of the land they had previously ruled in the plains, and retained only the Bhabhar region.

In early 1790, the Gurkhas invaded the Kumaon hills and Almora, they advanced by crossing River Kali, through Gangoli; and the Chands, under the titular Chand Raja, were driven to the Bhabhar and finally expelled.

The Terai and Kashipur were ceded to the British by the Nawab of Awadh in 1801, along with the rest of Rohilkhand.

Nepalese rule lasted for twenty-four years. The end came because of their repeated intrusion into British territories in the Terai from 1800 onwards. Lord Moira, the Governor-General of India, decided to attack Almora in December 1814, marking the beginning of the Anglo-Nepalese War. After the war, the old Lal Mandi fort, near Almora (present cantonment), was renamed ‘Fort Moira’.

Harak Deo Joshi, the minister of the last Chand Raja, took the side of the British, a force of 4500 men marched from Kashipur in February, 1815. Champawat was first taken in March from Pilibhit, through the Kali River. Within two months, a strong British army under Colonel Nichols attacked and captured Almora, on 26 April 1815. A truce was called the same day, and with the ratification of Treaty of Sugauli on 4 March 1816, Kumaon and Garhwal became a part of the British Raj.

List of Chand Kings 
Badri Datt Pandey, in his book Kumaun Ka Itihaas lists the Chand kings as following:

Panchpurviya

Five Clans namely: Deopa(Village Roba, Garkha Paspa), Serari (Village Sangor, Sorari Talli Malli), Puruchuda (Village Rundakot, Garkha Puruchudi), Chiral (Village Chhawati Chiral) and Paderu (Garkha Paderu) were known as Panch-purviyas. They were brought from Doti and settled in Kumaon by King Ratan Chand (1450–1488) after granting them jagirs. These Five clans were relatives of the Chand kings. After some time the Chiral family went back to Doti but other clans stayed.

Legacy 
The first capital of Chand rulers, Champawat, in the stronghold popularly known as Kali Kumaon, is now a district headquarters town, and hold many remnants of once powerful Chand reign, including a medieval fort, Baleshwar temple, Nagnath Temple, etc. Other temples of their reign are Golu Devata Temple, at Ghorakhal, near Bhimtal, and Bhimeshwara Mahadev Temple at Bhimtal.

See also 
Kumauni people

References

Bibliography 
  English version of "Kumaun ka itihas".
 
 
 

History of Uttarakhand
Dynasties of India
Rajput rulers
Kumaoni Rajputs
Champawat
Almora